Mascara is a cosmetic used on eyelashes.

Mascara may also refer to:

Arts and entertainment
 A Máscara, a Portuguese reality singing competition TV series
 "Mascara" (CSI: Crime Scene Investigation), a 2009 television episode
 Mascara (1987 film), a Belgian-Dutch-French film of 1987
 Mascara (1995 film), a South Korean film of 1995
 "Mascara" (song), by Killing Heidi, 1999
 "Mascara", a song by Deftones from Around the Fur

People
 Frank Mascara (1930–2011), American politician from Pennsylvania
 Giuseppe Mascara (born 1979), Italian football player and coach
 Ken Mascara (born 1958), American politician from Florida
 Robert Mascara (born 1972), Australian TV floor manager
 Tamara Mascara (born 1987), Austrian DJ, fashion designer, presenter, and drag queen
 Tina Mascara, American director, producer, and writer
 Mascara (musician), American electronic musician Shane Shumate

Other uses
 Mascara, Algeria, a city
 Mascara District, the district containing the city
 Mascara Province, the province containing the district and city
 Mascara Airfield, an abandoned military and civilian airfield near the city
 SS Mascara, originally the Empire Cadet, a French coastal tanker 1946-51
 MASCARA, an exoplanet experiment by Leiden University
 "Mascara (The Ugly Truth)", a song by Reks from the album Rhythmatic Eternal King Supreme

See also
 La Mascara (disambiguation)
 Mascaras (disambiguation), two places in France
 Mascarene Islands, an island group in the Indian Ocean
 Mascaró (disambiguation)